Angel Leonie Coulby (born 30 August 1980) is an English actress. She gained recognition for portraying the character Gwen (Guinevere) in the BBC fantasy series Merlin.

Early life
Coulby was born and grew up in Finsbury Park, Islington, London, and is of Afro-Guyanese descent. She studied for a degree in acting at Queen Margaret University, Edinburgh, achieved a first and was awarded the Laurence Olivier Bursary in 2000.

Career
Coulby was first seen in an episode of Scariest Places on Earth as a student who had an encounter with a ghost. Her breakthrough came in 2001 with her role in the Johnny Vaughan BBC sitcom 'Orrible.

She was later chosen to play Gwen, also known as Guinevere who would later become Queen, in the BBC One fantasy TV series Merlin. In an interview with the Los Angeles Times, Coulby stated that in playing Gwen she "liked the idea that you go on a bit of a journey as an actor, starting off as a humble maidservant, kind of a bit bumbling, and then obviously growing into this very capable queen", and it was "really nice to have that range throughout a job". She starred in all the five seasons, appearing in 61 of the 65 episodes.

She took the star role of the jazz singer Jessie in the BBC Two Stephen Poliakoff six-part 2013 drama serial Dancing on the Edge, alongside Chiwetel Ejiofor, John Goodman, Matthew Goode, Anthony Head and Jacqueline Bisset.

It was announced in February 2013 that Coulby would star in The Tunnel, a British-French remake of Scandinavian crime drama, The Bridge. She starred alongside Stephen Dillane and Clémence Poésy. The first series aired in late 2013, and Coulby reprised her role for a second series in 2016.

Coulby returned to the stage for the first time since 2014 in Rupert Goold's Albion at the Almeida Theatre in February 2020, which was filmed and broadcast on BBC Four in August 2020.

Coulby joined the cast of the Apple TV+ thriller Suspicion, which is a remake of the Hebrew-language series False Flag in March 2020. Coulby plays Vanessa Okoye, the investigator questioning the "five Brits, quickly pinpointed as the potential suspects" of the kidnapping in the thriller.

In June 2021 it was announced that Coulby will star in the series, The Net, as the character Diana. The Austrian football drama aired in November 2022 in conjunction with the 2022 FIFA World Cup.

In November 2021 it was announced she would be in the Hampstead Theatre production of The Forest by Florian Zeller in 2022. She plays the mistress, Sophie, of the protagonist, Pierre.

Personal life 

In 2019, Coulby announced she had become a mother to a son born in 2018.

Filmography

Theatre

Awards and nominations

References

External links

 

English television actresses
Black British actresses
Actresses from London
People from Finsbury Park
Alumni of Queen Margaret University
Living people
1980 births
21st-century English actresses
English people of Guyanese descent